Jean-Jacques Radonamahafalison (born 20 August 1978) is a Malagasy retired football midfielder.

References

1978 births
Living people
Malagasy footballers
Madagascar international footballers
AS Fortior players
Léopards de Transfoot players
Association football midfielders
Malagasy expatriate footballers
Expatriate footballers in Réunion
Malagasy expatriate sportspeople in Réunion